Latin hip hop (also known as Latin rap) is hip hop music that is recorded by artists in the United States of Hispanic and Latino descent, along with Spanish-speaking countries in the Caribbean, North America, Central America, South America, and Spain.

Latino hip hop in the United States

Latin rap
In the late 1980s and early 1990s, most Latin rap came from New York and the West Coast of the United States. Due to migration in the '60s and '70s, the birth of hip hop involved Latinos from the Caribbean islands. DJ Kool Herc was from Jamaica. Puerto Rico loved Hip Hop from America. Among the first rappers from the island were TNT, Brewley MC and Vico C. Later generations saw talented MCs, DJs and groups emerge all over the island. And artists from this period include Daddy Yankee, Anuel AA, Big Boy, Bad Bunny, MC Ceja, Noriel, Ozuna, Iann Dior, Ivy Queen, Mexicano, Chezina, Lito y Polaco, and Kool Bob Love.

Mellow Man Ace was the first Latino artist to have a major bilingual single, the 1989 track "Mentirosa". This song went platinum, leading Mellow Man Ace to be described as the "Godfather of Latin rap" and inducted into the Hip Hop Hall of Fame inductee. In 1990, fellow West Coast artist Kid Frost further brought Latinos to the rap forefront with his hit song "La Raza (song)." In 1991, Kid Frost, Mellow Man, A.L.T. and several other Latin rappers formed the rap super group Latin Alliance and released a self-titled album which featured the hit "Lowrider (On the Boulevard)". A.L.T. also scored a hit later that year with his remake of the song Tequila. Cypress Hill, of which Mellow Man Ace was a member before going solo, would become the first Latino rap group to reach platinum status in 1991. The group has since continued to release other Gold and Platinum albums. Ecuadorian born rapper Gerardo received heavy rotation on video and radio for his single "Rico, Suave". While commercially watered-down, his album enjoyed a status of being one of the first mainstream Spanglish CDs on the market. Johnny J was a multi-platinum songwriter, music producer, and rapper who was perhaps best known for his production on Tupac Shakur's albums All Eyez on Me and Me Against the World. He also produced the 1990 single Knockin' Boots for his classmate Candyman's album Ain't No Shame in My Game, which eventually went platinum thanks to the single.

In the mid-1990s, the success of LA's Cypress Hill led to additional Latin hip-hop artists finding label support. Delinquent Habits were a horn-sampling trio that found MTV support for their breakout bilingual single "Tres Delinquentes" in 1996. By the early 2000's, two Mexico-born, United States-raised Latin hip hop acts found success on major labels. LA's Akwid fused banda with hip-hop on hits like "No Hay Manera" while Milwaukee's Kinto Sol told tales of Mexican immigrant life over more minimalist beats. The genre even spawned a bicultural novelty, the Brooklyn-based crew Hip Hop Hoodíos, who fused their dual Jewish and Latino cultures on songs like "Havana Nagila" and "Raza Hoodía."

Latin rap in the East Coast and Miami
DJ Charlie Chase fused hip-hop with salsa and other music genres. Chase was the DJ for the New York hip-hop group the Cold Crush Brothers, from 1978 and through the '80s. East Coast Latin artists such as the Beatnuts emerged in the early 1990s, with New Jersey native Chino XL earning recognition for his lyricism and equal controversy for his subject matter. In 1992, Mesanjarz of Funk, led by the Spanish/English flow of Mr. Pearl, became the first Spanish rap group signed to a major label (Atlantic Records).  In 1994, Platinum Producer and DJ Frankie Cutlass used his own label, Hoody Records, to produce his single “Puerto Rico” which became a classic. In the late 1990s, Puerto Rican rapper Big Punisher became the first Latino solo artist to reach platinum sales for an LP with his debut album Capital Punishment, which included hit song "Still Not a Player".

Southwest and Chicano rap
Latin rap (as well as its subgenre of Chicano rap) has thrived along the West Coast, Southwest and Midwestern states with little promotion due to the large Latino populations of those regions. Jonny Z is considered to be a pioneer of Latin hip-hop, due to him being one of the first Latinos combining Spanglish lyrics with freestyle, salsa, mambo, and regional Mexican banda. He scored four Billboard Hot Dance singles between 1993 and 1997, including one of the greatest Miami bass songs of all time, "Shake Shake (Shake That Culo)". Besides bass music, he also recorded the Chicano anthem "Orale". The Oxford Encyclopedia of Latinos and Latinas in the United States Volume 2, Page 301 states: "A new style of Latina and Latino hip-hop was created in Miami and Texas by the bass rappers DJ Laz and Jonny Z, who mixed Latin styles with bass music".

Latin hip hop in other countries
Latin rap in Puerto Rico has had a substantial impact on the genres (rap, and Latin rap) and relate a certain message to their respective audiences. Puerto Rican rap emerged as a form of cultural and social protest within the Puerto Rican context. This is similar to the way American and Jamaican youth used rap and reggae/dancehall as a means to communicate their feelings on social, cultural, and political issues. In essence, Puerto Rican rap became the voice of the Puerto Rican youth in which they use dancehall and rap music as methods of expression for the Jamaican and working-class American youth counterparts as they made it in France too since 2003 "1492 Army".

In the late 1990s, hip-hop took hold in Mexico, especially with the platinum success of Mexican rap pioneers Control Machete. The genre also found prominence with Latin alternative artists who fused hip-hop rhymes with live instrumentation, including rap-rockers Molotov and cumbia-rockers El Gran Silencio.

There are many hip-hop scenes in Latin America, including a growing rap movement in Buenos Aires.

Narco-rap
A music scene, similar to the early underground gangsta rap scene, has emerged in northeastern Mexico (Nuevo León, Tamaulipas and Coahuila), where the musical phenomenon of hip-hop is being co-opted by the influence of organized crime and the drug war in the region.

Some of the main exponents of the genre are Cano y Blunt, DemenT and Big Los.

Freestyle

In the mid-2000s, freestyle music was initially called "Latin hip hop". This dance music genre, not to be confused with improvised freestyle rapping, was dominated, at the time, by electro funk beats and electronic Latin melodic and percussion elements, over which Latino vocalists sang melodramatic pop vocals, usually in English even though it was started by Nuyorican natives and African-Americans primarily. Freestyle has been primarily popular among Latinos in the New York City, Miami, Chicago and California club scenes, but achieved national mainstream pop success with hits by Lisa Lisa, the Cover Girls, George Lamond, Stevie B, TKA and Exposé, among others.

Latin trap

In 2015, a new movement of trap music referred to as "Latin trap" began to emerge. Also known as Spanish-language trap, Latin trap similar to mainstream trap which details "'la calle,' or the streets — hustling, sex, and drugs". Prominent artists of Latin trap include Messiah, Fuego, Anuel AA and Bad Bunny. In July 2017, The Fader wrote "Rappers and reggaetoneros from Puerto Rico to Colombia have taken elements of trap — the lurching bass lines, jittering 808s and the eyes-half-closed vibe — and infused them into banger after banger." In an August 2017 article for Billboard's series, "A Brief History Of," they enlisted some of the key artists of Latin trap—including Ozuna, De La Ghetto, Bad Bunny, Farruko and Messiah—to narrate a brief history on the genre. Elias Leight of Rolling Stone noted "[Jorge] Fonseca featured Puerto Rican artists like Anuel AA, Bryant Myers and Noriel on the compilation Trap Capos: Season 1, which became the first "Latin trap" LP to reach Number One on Billboard's Latin Rhythm Albums chart." A remixed version of Cardi B's hit single "Bodak Yellow" (which reached number one on the US Billboard Hot 100 chart), dubbed the "Latin Trap Remix", was officially released on August 18, 2017 and features Cardi B rapping in the Spanish language with Dominican hip hop recording artist Messiah contributing a guest verse. In November 2017, Rolling Stone wrote that "a surging Latin trap sound is responding to more recent developments in American rap, embracing the slow-rolling rhythms and gooey vocal delivery popularized by Southern hip-hop."

See also

 Avanzada Regia
 Brazilian hip hop
 Chicano rap
 Cuban hip hop
 Dominican hip hop
 Merenrap
 Mexican hip hop
 Nuyorican rap
 Salvadoran hip hop
 Spanish hip hop

Further reading
 Flores, Juan. From Bomba to Hip-Hop Puerto Rican Culture and Latino Identity. New York: Columbia University Press, 2000.
 George, Nelson. Hip Hop America. New York: Penguin, 1998.
 Kitwana, Bakari. The Hip Hop Generation. Basic Books, 2002.
 Rivera, Raquel. New Yorkricans from the Hip Hop Zone. New York: Palgrave Macmillan, 2003.

References

External links

LatinRapper.com—Source for Latin rap news and interviews
BrownPride.com at BrownPride.com—a collection of texts and links about Latin rap

 
American hip hop genres
Urbano music genres
Hispanic American music
Hip hop
Latin music genres